Neighboring Sounds is an indie band from Bergen, Norway. 2004-2006 the band was called The First Cut and before 2004 the band was called Crash (n).

Crash (n) was formed in 2000 in Bergen, Norway. The band released two 7", one 10" and a CD, toured Europe and Scandinavia once and the UK twice. After Aaron Arjuna Rudra left the band in 2003 the band chose to change name and continued as The First Cut. The band did numerous shows and released a CD in 2006 called "Silence afterwards", but due to different circumstances the band found it hard to carry on with touring and kept a low profile throughout 2005 and 2006. 
 
The First Cut was on a hiatus from 2005 until 2014. Thomas Santuna Larssen played bass in Datarock, and Ralph Myerz and the Jack Herren Band while Kristian Gundersen used to play in the band I.O.U. Arild Eriksen sang and played bass in Bouvet.

In 2014 the band reformed under the name Neighboring Sounds. Yngve Andersen from the band Blood Command played bass. The band first recorded a few songs with Kenneth Ishak of Beezewax in 2016 but only released the song Everyone's From Somewhere Else digitally. Thomas Larssen joined the band again in 2016. The band recorded another few songs with Kenneth Ishak in 2019 and released the single Spolia in 2020 on the label Sound Fiction.

Anders Blom from the bands Flight Mode, Youth Pictures of Florence Henderson, Islandsgate and Ben Leiper joined on bass in 2021. Neighboring Sounds played concerts in Oslo and Bergen in 2021 and plan on recording an album spring 2022.

Discography 

 As Neighboring Sounds
Everyone's From Somewhere Else 7" (2021)
Spolia Digital (2020)
Everyone's From Somewhere Else Digital (2020)

 As The First Cut
Silence Afterwards CD (2006)

 As Crash (n)
Crash (2000) 7" on Sound Fiction.
Young Boy I Can Help You Through Your Exams (2001) 10" on Sound Fiction and Premonition Records.
Split with Solea (US) (2002) 7" on Sound Fiction.
Young Boy I Can Help You Through Your Exams and more (2003) CD on *Firefly Recordings.

References

External links 
Official website
Label
Review in major Norwegian newspaper
Review in dagbladet - Norwegian tabloid
Youth magazine Spirit mentions The First Cut and interviews Arild Eriksen
Aftenposten mention The First Cut as important emo band in Norway
the band featured on this is music from Norway
Video for the song Last Year's Ambulance - Copyright 2006 The First Cut

Norwegian musical groups